Cowling is a small village in the Hambleton District of North Yorkshire, England. It is in the parish of Burrill with Cowling and 1 mile west of Bedale.

Villages in North Yorkshire